Red Sulphur Sky is a solo album by American jazz trumpeter Wadada Leo Smith which was recorded in 2001 and released on Tzadik Records.

Reception

In his review for AllMusic, Thom Jurek notes "Smith offers an album full of warmth and humor that is genuinely accessible."

The Penguin Guide to Jazz states "This is a devastatingly beautiful recital, calling on all of Smith's technique as well as his wonderfully poetic musical personality."

Track listing
All compositions by Wadada Leo Smith
 "Red Sulphur Sky" - 6:12
 "Evening Glow a Shining Outward" - 4:36
 "The Medicine Wheel" - 20:34
 "Afmie: Purity and Poverty" - 21:06

Personnel
Wadada Leo Smith - trumpet, flugelhorn

References

2001 albums
Wadada Leo Smith albums
Tzadik Records albums